Data thinking is a product design framework with a particular emphasis on data science. It integrates elements of computational thinking, statistical thinking, and domain thinking. In the context of product development, data thinking is a framework to explore, design, develop and validate data-driven solutions. Data thinking combines data science with design thinking and therefore, the focus of this approach includes user experience as well as data analytics and data collection.

The term was created by Mario Faria and Rogerio Panigassi in 2013 when in a book about data science, data analytics, data management, and how data practitioners were able to achieve their goals.

Major Components of Data Thinking 
According to Mike et al.:

 Data thinking is the understanding that a solution to a real-life problem should not be based only on data and algorithms, but also on the domain knowledge-driven rules that govern them. 
 Data thinking asks whether the data offer a good representation of the real-life situation. It also addresses how data were collected and asks, “Can the data collection be improved?”. 
 Data thinking is the understanding that data are not just numbers to be stored in an adequate data structure, but that these numbers have a meaning that derives from the domain knowledge. 
 Data thinking is understanding that any process or calculation performed on the data should preserve the meaning of the relevant knowledge domain. 
 Data thinking analyzes the data not only logically but also statistically, using visualizations and statistical methods to find patterns as well as irregular phenomena. 
 Data thinking is understanding that problem abstraction is domain-depended, and generalization is subject to biases and variance in the data.
 Data thinking is understanding that lab testing is not enough, and that real-life implementation will always encounter unexpected data and situations, and so improving the models and the solution for a given problem is a continuous process that includes, among other activities, constant and iterative monitoring and data collection.

Major Phases of Data Thinking 
Even though no standardized process for data thinking yet exists, the major phases of the process are similar in many publications and could be summarized as follows:

Clarification of the Strategic Context and definition of data-driven risks and opportunities focus areas 
During this phase, the broader context of digital strategy is analyzed. Before starting with a concrete project, it is essential to understand how the new data and AI-driven technologies are affecting the business landscape and the implications this has on the future of an organization. Trend analysis / technology forecasting and scenario planning/analysis as well as internal data capability assessments are the major techniques that are typically applied at this stage.

Ideation/Exploration 
The result of the earlier stage is a definition of the focus areas which are either the most promising or are at the highest risks for or due to data-driven transformation. At the Ideation/exploration phase, the concrete use cases are defined for the selected focus areas. For successful Ideation, it is important to combine information about organizational (business) goals, internal/external use needs, data and infrastructure needs as well as domain knowledge about the latest data-driven technologies and trends.

Design thinking principles in the context of data thinking can be interpreted as follows: when developing data-driven ideas, it is crucial to consider the intersection of technical feasibility, business impact, and data availability. Typical instruments of design thinking (e.g. user research, personas, customer journey) are broadly applied at this stage.

In addition to user needs, customer and strategic needs must also be considered here. Data needs, data availability analysis, and research on the AI technologies suitable for the solution are essential parts of the development process.

To scope data and the technological foundation of the solution, practices from cross-industry standard processes for data mining (CRISP-DM) are typically used at this stage.

Prototyping / Proof of Concept 
During the previous stages, the major concept of the data solution was developed. Now, a proof of concept is conducted to check the solution's feasibility. This stage also includes testing, evaluation, iteration, and refinement. Prototyping design principles are also combined during this phase with process models that are applied in data science projects (e.g. CRISP-DM).

Measuring business impact 
Solution feasibility and profitability are proven during the data thinking process. Cost benefits analysis and business case calculation are commonly applied during this step.

Implementation and Improvement 
If the developed solution proves its feasibility and profitability during this phase, it will be implemented and operationalized.

References 

Data management
Product development
Applied data mining
Innovation